Astrea was launched at Stockton in 1812. She served as a transport for the British government until about 1819. Thereafter she traded with the Baltic, the Caribbean, and Quebec. She was wrecked, with great loss of life, on 8 May 1834 while carrying migrants to Quebec.

Career
Astrea first appeared in Lloyd's Register (LR) in 1812.

Fate
Astrea was on a voyage from Limerick to Quebec City.

She was carrying 13 crew members and 211 passengers, consisting on 104 adult males, mostly farmers and agricultural labourers from Limerick, Clare, and Tipperary, and their wives and children. The three survivors consisted of her surgeon, who was emigrating to Canada, and two crew members.

Citations and references
Citations

References
 

1812 ships
Age of Sail merchant ships of England
Migrant ships to Canada
Maritime incidents in May 1834